Sacred Heart Catholic School is a private, Roman Catholic K-12 school in Hallettsville, Texas.  It is located in the Roman Catholic Diocese of Victoria in Texas.

Background
Sacred Heart was established as an all-girls boarding school by the Sisters of the Incarnate Word and Blessed Sacrament in 1882. Boys were admitted in 1892. The high school portion of the school was closed in 1926 and reopened in 1948.

References

External links
 
 Diocese of Victoria, Texas

Catholic secondary schools in Texas
Schools in Lavaca County, Texas
Educational institutions established in 1882
Private K-12 schools in Texas
1882 establishments in Texas